= RatingsIntel =

TV network analysis service

- Company type: Limited Liability Company
- Industry: media research
- Predecessor: CableU
- Founded: 2013
- Successor: NewBay Media
- Headquarters: New York, New York, United States
- Website: http://www.ratingsintel.com

Ratings Intelligence is an online subscription-based service that monitors and analyzes television network performance and programming trends. The website was originally launched in 2006 under the name CableU and became RatingsIntel on July 9, 2013, after the company formed a new ratings agreement with Nielsen and expanded its offering to cover broadcast networks as well as cable.

In 2014, the company was acquired. by NewBay Media--a New York-based holding company backed by private equity firm The Wicks Group
